Gel Jari (also Romanized as Gel Jārī and Gol Jārī) is a village in Chahardangeh Rural District, Chahardangeh District, Sari County, Mazandaran Province, Iran. At the 2006 census, its population was 31, in 9 families.

References 

Populated places in Sari County